Rodolfo Guzmán Huerta (23 September 1917 – 5 February 1984), known professionally as El Santo or in English The Saint, was a Mexican luchador enmascarado (Spanish for "masked professional wrestler"), actor and folk hero. He is one of the most famous and iconic Mexican luchadores, and has been referred to as one of "the greatest legends in Mexican sports". His wrestling career spanned nearly five decades, during which he became a folk hero and a symbol of justice for the common man through his appearances in lucha films and comic books telling fictionalized stories of El Santo fighting for justice. He starred or co-starred in at least 54 movies between 1958 and 1982.

During his career, he mainly wrestled for Empresa Mundial de Lucha Libre in Mexico where he won the Mexican National Light Heavyweight Championship, Mexican National Middleweight Championship, Mexican National Tag Team Championship with Rayo de Jalisco, Mexican National Welterweight Championship, NWA World Middleweight Championship and the NWA World Welterweight Championship. Early in his career Rodolfo Guzmán worked under the ring names Rudy Guzmán, Hombre Rojo, El Enmascarado, Murciélago Enmascarado II and El Demonio Negro but became "El Enmascarado de Plata" ("The man of the silver mask") in 1942.

Guzmán's brothers were also luchadores, with Black Guzmán being the first to make his debut and Pantera Negra and Jimmy Guzmán later joining as well. Only one of Rodolfo Guzmán's eleven children followed him into professional wrestling, El Hijo del Santo ("The Son of theSaint") making his debut in 1982. In 2018, WWE inducted him into their Hall of Fame in the Legacy category. El Hijo del Santo's son made his debut as "Santo Jr." in 2016. Another grandson (not a son of El Hijo del Santo) originally wrestled as "El Nieto del Santo" ("The Grandson of Santo"), but now works under the name Axxel.

Rodolfo Guzmán is said to have popularized professional wrestling in Mexico just as Rikidōzan did in Japan. He was buried in his silver mask, in one of the biggest funerals in Mexico. The Consejo Mundial de Lucha Libre honors El Santo with the Leyenda de Plata ("The Silver Legend") tournament.

Childhood
Rodolfo Guzmán Huerta was born on 23 September 1917, in Tulancingo, Hidalgo, son of Jesús Guzmán Campuzano and Josefina Huerta (Márquez) de Guzmán as the fifth of seven children, Rodolfo came to Mexico City in the 1920s, where his family settled in the Tepito neighborhood. He practiced baseball and American football, and then became interested in wrestling. He first studied Ju-Jitsu and then later competed in amateur wrestling. Rodolfo has a brother who entered the wrestling business as well, Miguel, who is known as Black Guzmán (due to his dark skin).

Professional wrestling career

Early career
Accounts vary as to exactly when and where he first wrestled competitively, either in Arena Peralvillo Cozumel on 28 June 1934, Deportivo Islas in the Guerrero colony of Mexico City in 1935, or 26 July 1942, but by the second half of the 1930s, he was established as a wrestler, using the names Rudy Guzmán, El Hombre Rojo (the Red Man), El Demonio Negro (The Black Demon) and El Murcielago II (The Bat II). The last name was the same as that of wrestler Jesus Velazquez, named "El Murcielago" (The Bat), and after an appeal by the Bat to the Mexican boxing and wrestling commission, the regulatory body ruled that Guzmán could not use the name.

El Santo

In the early 1940s, Guzmán married María de los Ángeles Rodríguez Montaño (Maruca), a union that would produce 10 children; including his youngest child Jorge, who also became a famous wrestler in his own right, El Hijo del Santo ("The Son of Santo"). In 1942, Rodolfo's manager, Don Jesús Lomelí, was putting together a new team of wrestlers, all dressed in silver, and wanted Rodolfo to be a part of it. He suggested three names, El Santo (The Saint), El Diablo (The Devil), or El Angel (The Angel), and Rodolfo chose the first one. On 26 June, aged 24, he wrestled at the Arena Mexico for the first time as El Santo, although he later was known simply as "Santo". Under this new name he quickly found his style.

One of Santo's greatest matches was in 1952, when he fought a tag-team known as Los Hermanos Shadow (which consisted of famed luchadors Blue Demon and the Black Shadow). Santo beat and unmasked Black Shadow in the ring, which triggered Blue Demon's decision to become a técnico, as well as a legendary feud between Blue Demon and Santo that culminated in Santo's defeat in a well-publicized series of matches in 1952 and again in 1953. Although they appeared together in a number of action/adventure films, their rivalry never really ended in later years since Santo always remembered his defeat at Blue Demon's hands.

El Santo was known to never remove his mask, even in private company. When traveling on flights, he made sure to take a different flight than his crew to avoid having them see his face when he was required to remove his mask to get through customs.

Retirement
By the early 1980s El Santo slowed down his in-ring activities leading up to his inevitable retirement. His farewell tour was announced for August and September 1982. The first of three events took place on 22 August 1982 at the Palacio de los Deportes in Mexico City. On that night El Santo teamed up with El Solitario to take on Villano III and Rokambole in a match that naturally saw the legends win. After the match Villano and Rokambole lifted El Santo up on their shoulders as he received the adulation of the sold-out arena. The following Sunday El Santo appeared at Arena México where he teamed up with Gran Hamada to defeat Villano I and Scorpio Jr. Santo's last match took place on 12 September 1982, a week before his 65th birthday. In his last match ever El Santo teamed up with Gory Guerrero who came out of retirement to reform "La Pareja Atómica" as they teamed up with Huracán Ramirez and El Solitario. Their opponents included one of El Santo's biggest rivals in Perro Aguayo as well as El Signo, Negro Navarro and El Texano. True to the legend of El Santo he won his last match and retired as the hero he always portrayed in the ring and on the screen. His retirement tour was also used to introduce Santo's son Jorge as the next generation El Santo as he was ringside at each show wearing the silver mask and being introduced as El Hijo del Santo.

Film career

In 1952, the artist and editor José G. Cruz started a Santo comic book, turning Santo into the first and foremost character in Mexican popular literature, his popularity only rivalled in the 1960s by the legendary Kalimán character. The Santo comic book series (four different volumes) ran continuously for 35 years, ending in 1987.

Also in 1952, a superhero motion picture serial was made entitled The Man in the Silver Mask, which was supposed to star Santo, but he declined to appear in it, because he thought it would fail commercially. The film was made instead with well-known luchador El Médico Asesino in the lead role, wearing a white mask similar to Santo's silver one. A villain named "The Silver-Masked Man" was introduced into the plot at the last minute, thus the title of the film strangely became a reference to the villain, not the hero.

In 1958, Fernando Osés, a wrestler and actor, invited Santo to work in movies, and although Santo was unwilling to give up his wrestling career, he accepted, planning to do both at the same time. Oses was planning on playing the hero (a masked cop named "El Incognito") in these two films, with Santo appearing as his costumed sidekick, "El Enmascarado". Fernando Osés and Enrique Zambrano wrote the scripts for the first two movies, el Cerebro del Mal (The Evil Brain) and Hombres Infernales (The Infernal Men), both made in 1958, and directed by Joselito Rodríguez. Filming was done in Cuba, and ended just the day before Fidel Castro entered Havana and declared the victory of the revolution. Santo played a masked superhero-type sidekick to the main hero (who was called El Incognito) in these two films, and was not the main character (nor was he depicted as a wrestler in these 2 films, but rather a masked police agent of some sort). The films apparently could not find a distributor for several years. Santo's film career really took off in 1961 with his third movie "Santo vs The Zombies." Santo was given the starring role with this film, and was shown for the first time as a professional wrestler moonlighting as a superhero. When Santo's film career took off in 1961, the producers of the first two films slyly entered Santo's name into the titles and finally got them released.

Santo eventually wound up appearing in 53 lucha libre films in all (two of which were just cameo appearances). The style of the movies was essentially the same throughout the series, with Santo as a superhero fighting supernatural creatures, evil scientists, various criminals/ secret agents and so on. The tones were reminiscent of U.S. B-movies and TV shows, perhaps most similar to the old Republic Pictures serials of the 1940s. Many of the later films depicted Santo in simulated sex scenes during which he continued to wear the mask.

His best-known movie outside of Mexico is also considered one of his best, 1962's Santo vs. las Mujeres Vampiro (Santo vs. the Vampire Women), which was also featured in an episode of Mystery Science Theater 3000. In this movie, the production values were better, and there was an attempt at creating more of a mythos and background for Santo, as the last of a long line of superheroes. It was an enormous success at the box office. Only four of the 53 Santo films were ever dubbed into English, the other 48 being only available in Spanish. The English-dubbed Mexican films of that time period were imported to the United States through the efforts of K. Gordon Murray who changed the name of Santo to "Samson" for some of his releases. Most of Murray's imported Mexi-films went directly to late-night American TV. Santo's most financially successful film was The Mummies of Guanajuato (1970), which co-starred Blue Demon and Mil Mascaras.

The Santo film series inspired the production of similar series of movies starring other well-known luchadores such as Blue Demon, Mil Mascaras, Superzan, and the Wrestling Women (aka Las Luchadoras), among others. Santo even co-starred with Blue Demon and Mil Mascaras in several of his movies. When Blue Demon invited Santo to co-star with him and Mil Mascaras in the "Champions of Justice" movie trilogy, however, Santo was too busy making other films to participate.

By 1977, the masked wrestler film craze had practically died off, but Santo continued to appear in more films over the next few years. His last film was Fury of the Karate Experts, shot in Florida in 1982, the same year he retired from the ring.

Seventeen years after Santo's death, his real-life son played the lead role in a brand new Santo movie called Infraterrestre (2001), which co-starred Mexican wrestler Blue Panther.

Other media

Santo also became an animated mini-series on Cartoon Network in Latin America, and was called Santo Contra Los Clones. On 27 October 2004, Cartoon Network released an only season of 5 short episodes. Each episode is about 2 minutes long, and they were shown weekly on Wednesday nights at 8:00 PM.

El Santo also inspired the Flash animated series ¡Mucha Lucha! and El Tigre: The Adventures of Manny Rivera. In ¡Mucha Lucha! he's called "El Rey", and is represented as an icon of all positive things.

Santo is immortalized in the rockabilly band Southern Culture on the Skids' 1996 album Santo Swings!/Viva el Santo. Santo is often resurrected in Southern Culture's live performances when an audience member jumps onstage donning Santo's mask. The Latin ska band King Changó released an album titled The Return of El Santo.

Turkish actor Yavuz Selekman portrayed an unlicensed version of Santo in the bootleg Turkish film 3 Dev Adam. This movie is also known in the United States as "Captain America and Santo Vs. Spider-Man."

He also is referred to by Mexican rock band Botellita de Jerez in their song Santo, in which they speak of Santo's victories in the ring and in the movies as well as the great respect he was given as a Mexican movie hero.

El Santo and several other masked wrestlers make a brief cameo in the Batman '66 comic series, based on the Batman TV series that originally aired in the 1960s. They aid Batman in defeating the evil luchador Bane after Batman cuts Bane off from using Venom to boost his strength.

Death

Just over a year after his retirement (in late January 1984), El Santo was a guest on Contrapunto, a Mexican television program and, without warning, removed his mask just enough to expose his face, in effect bidding his fans goodbye. It is the only documented case of Santo ever removing his mask in public. Santo died at a hospital from a heart attack (during a stage show he was putting on) on 5 February 1984, at 9:40 p.m., a week after his Contrapunto television appearance. He had been complaining of pain in his arm prior to his death. In accordance with his wishes, he was buried wearing his famous silver mask. Around 10 thousand people, including Blue Demon and Mil Mascaras, attended his funeral, which was among the largest in the history of Mexico. He was entombed at a crypt on the Mausoleos del Ángel cemetery in Mexico City.  It reportedly took hours for Santo's coffin to make it from the funeral parlour into the hearse.

Legacy
After his death, a statue of El Santo was erected in his home town of Tulancingo and other statues have been created since then.

Santo's youngest son with his first wife, Jorge carries on the legend of the Silver Mask, wrestling as El Hijo del Santo wearing the silver mask, cape and outfit that is very close to what his father used to wear. While El Hijo del Santo is not as big an icon as his father, he is considered a more technically proficient wrestler.

In the early 1960s a female wrestler called La Novia del Santo (Spanish for "the Bride of El Santo") worked the Mexican circuit. Under the silver mask was Irma González, a well-known wrestler who had promised her fiancé that she would stop wrestling, but went back in the ring under a mask when she could not resist the draw of competition. La Novia got El Santo's blessing to use the name and is the only non-family member ever given the right to use the Santo name. Gonzáles only wrestled as "La Novia del Santo" for 7 months until she got married. Later on, another wrestler adopted the "La Novia del Santo" name, but El Santo took action and put an end to the unauthorized use of the name.

Recently one of El Santo's 25 grandchildren made his professional debut. After gaining some seasoning under different identities, he began working as "El Nieto del Santo" (Spanish for "the Grandson of Santo"). El Hijo del Santo took legal actions to prevent this as he owns all "El Santo" rights when it comes to wrestling, presumably because he himself is planning on letting one of his own sons use the "El Nieto del Santo" name. These days, the grandson of El Santo works as "Axxel" and only uses "El Nieto del Santo" as an unofficial nickname to avoid any legal issues. Axxel uses the same trademark mask, cape and trunk design as El Santo but has incorporated black trim and knee pads, presumably not to infringe on the legal rights of El Hijo del Santo. In August 2012, a court ruled in favor of Axxel, allowing him to again begin working as El Nieto del Santo. In July 2016, another one of El Santo's grandchildren and the son of El Hijo del Santo began working under the name "El Santo Jr."

On 23 September 2016, to honor the 99th birthday of El Santo, Google Doodle ran a special El Santo Google doodle for that day.

He was inducted into the WWE Hall of Fame in 2018 as part of the Legacy Inductees of that year.

A skeletal version of El Santo, complete with silver mask and cape, appears briefly in the 2017 Pixar film Coco, as a guest at a party in the Land of the Dead, with actress María Félix as his date.

Filmography

 Santo contra el cerebro del mal (Santo vs. the Evil Brain, 1958) released in 1961
 Santo contra hombres infernales (Santo vs. the Infernal Men, 1958) released in 1961
 Santo contra los zombies (Santo vs. the Zombies, 1961) a.k.a. Invasion of the Zombies (one of the four Santo films that was dubbed in English)
 Santo contra el rey del crimen (Santo vs. The King of Crime, 1961)
 Santo en el hotel de la muerte (Santo in the Hotel of Death, 1961)
 Santo contra el cerebro diabolico (Santo vs. the Diabolical Brain, 1962)
 Santo contra las mujeres vampiro (Santo vs. The Vampire Women, 1962) a.k.a. Samson vs. the Vampire Women (one of the four Santo films that was dubbed in English)
 Santo en el museo de cera (Santo in the Wax Museum, 1963) a.k.a. Samson in the Wax Museum (one of the four Santo films that was dubbed in English)
 Santo contra el estrangulador (Santo vs. the Strangler, 1963)
 Santo contra el espectro del estrangulador (Santo vs. the Ghost of the Strangler, 1963)
 Blue Demon contra el poder satánico (Blue Demon vs. Satanic Power, 1964) (Santo has only a cameo appearance here)
 Santo en Atacan las brujas (Santo in "The Witches Attack", 1964) a.k.a. Santo en la casa de las brujas Santo en el hacha diabólica (Santo in "The Diabolical Axe", 1964)
 Santo en los profanadores de tumbas (Santo in "The Grave Robbers", 1965)
 Santo en el Barón Brakola (Santo in "Baron Brakola", 1965)
 Santo contra la invasión de los marcianos (Santo vs. the Martian Invasion, 1966)
 Santo contra los villanos del ring (Santo vs. the Villains of the Ring, 1966) (Santo's last B&W film)
 Santo en Operación 67 (Santo in "Operation 67", 1966) (Santo's first color film)
 Santo en el tesoro de Moctezuma (Santo in "The Treasure of Montezuma", 1967)
 Santo en el tesoro de Drácula (Santo in "The Treasure of Dracula", 1968) a.k.a. The Vampire and Sex (a separate adult-rated version)
 Santo contra Capulina (Santo vs. Capulina, 1968)
 Santo contra Blue Demon en la Atlántida (Santo vs. Blue Demon in Atlantis, 1969)
 Santo y Blue Demon contra los monstruos (Santo and Blue Demon vs. the Monsters, 1969)
 Santo y Blue Demon en el mundo de los muertos (Santo and Blue Demon in the World of the Dead, 1969)
 Santo contra los cazadores de cabezas (Santo vs. the Headhunters, 1969)
 Santo frente a la muerte (Santo Faces Death, 1969) a.k.a. Santo vs. the Mafia Killers
 Santo contra los jinetes del terror (Santo vs. the Terror Riders, 1970) a.k.a. The Lepers and Sex (a separate adult-rated version)
 Santo en la venganza de las mujeres vampiro (Santo in "The Revenge of the Vampire Women", 1970)
 Santo contra la mafia del vicio (Santo vs. the Mafia of Vice, 1970) a.k.a. Mission Sabotage
 Santo en la venganza de la momia (Santo in "The Mummy's Revenge", 1970)
 Las momias de Guanajuato (The Mummies of Guanajuato, 1970) (co-starring Mil Mascaras and Blue Demon)
 Santo en el misterio de la perla negra (Santo in "The Mystery of the Black Pearl", 1971) a.k.a. The Caribbean Connection (this film was released in Spain in 1971, but was only released in Mexico in 1975)
 Santo contra la hija de Frankenstein (Santo vs. Frankenstein's Daughter, 1971)
 Santo en misión suicida (Santo in "Suicide Mission", 1971)
 Santo contra los asesinos de otros mundos (Santo vs. the Killers from Other Worlds, 1971) a.k.a. Santo vs. the Living Atom
 Santo y el tigresa en el aguila real (Santo and the Tigress in "The Royal Eagle", 1971)
 Santo y Blue Demon contra Drácula y el Hombre Lobo (Santo and Blue Demon vs. Dracula and the Wolf Man, 1972)
 Santo contra los secuestradores (Santo vs. the Kidnappers, 1972)
 Santo contra la magia negra (Santo vs. Black Magic, 1972)
 Santo y Blue Demon en las bestias del terror (Santo and Blue Demon in "The Beasts of Terror", 1972)
 Santo contra las lobas (Santo vs. the She-Wolves, 1972)
 Santo en Anónimo mortal (Santo in "Anonymous Death Threat", 1972)
 Santo y Blue Demon contra el doctor Frankenstein (Santo and Blue Demon vs. Dr. Frankenstein, 1973)
 Santo contra el doctor Muerte (Santo vs. Dr. Death, 1973) a.k.a. Santo Strikes Again, a.k.a. The Masked Man Strikes Again (one of the four Santo films that was dubbed in English) (Note* The English-language print was distributed in black and white, not Color)
 Santo en la venganza de la llorona (Santo in "The Revenge of the Crying Woman", 1974) (co-starring boxing champ Mantequilla Napoles) (see Jose Napoles)
 Santo en Oro negro (Santo in "Black Gold", 1975) a.k.a. La Noche de San Juan
 Santo en el Misterio en las Bermudas (Santo in "The Bermuda Mystery", 1977) (co-starring Blue Demon and Mil Mascaras)
 Santo en la frontera del terror (Santo in "The Border of Terror", 1979) a.k.a. Santo vs. the White Shadow
 Santo contra el asesino de televisión (Santo vs. the TV Killer, 1981)
 Chanoc y el hijo del Santo contra los vampiros asesinos (Chanoc and the Son of Santo vs. the Killer Vampires, 1981) (Santo has only a cameo appearance here)
 Santo en el puño de la muerte (Santo in "The Fist of Death", 1982)
 Santo en la furia de los karatekas (Santo in "The Fury of the Karate Experts", 1982)

Postscript:
 Infraterrestre (Inner Earth) (2001) A Santo film made two decades after Santo's death, in which the role of Santo is played by el Hijo de Santo (his real-life son).

 Championships and accomplishments Empresa Mundial de Lucha LibreEMLL Arena México Tag Team Championship (2 times)  with Rayo de Jalisco (1), and Ray Mendoza (1)
Mexican National Light Heavyweight Championship (1 time)
Mexican National Middleweight Championship (5 times)
Mexican National Tag Team Championship (2 times) - with Rayo de Jalisco
Mexican National Welterweight Championship (2 times)
NWA World Middleweight Championship (2 time)
NWA World Welterweight Championship (2 time)Professional Wrestling Hall of FameClass of 2013Wrestling Observer Newsletter awardsWrestling Observer Newsletter Hall of Fame (Class of 1996)WWE'
WWE Hall of Fame (Class of 2018)

Luchas de Apuestas record

References

Further reading

External links

 
 The Films of El Santo, El Enmascarado De Plata
 Santo and friends
 Santo-biography with emphasis on his film work on (re)Search my Trash
 
 

1917 births
1984 deaths
20th-century Mexican male actors
Deaths onstage
Masked wrestlers
Mexican male film actors
Mexican male professional wrestlers
People from Tulancingo
Professional wrestlers from Hidalgo (state)
Professional Wrestling Hall of Fame and Museum
WWE Hall of Fame Legacy inductees
20th-century professional wrestlers
Mexican National Middleweight Champions
Mexican National Welterweight Champions
NWA World Middleweight Champions
NWA World Welterweight Champions
Mexican National Light Heavyweight Champions